TATA-box binding protein associated factor 7 like is a protein that in humans is encoded by the TAF7L gene.

Function

This gene is similar to a mouse gene that encodes a TATA box binding protein-associated factor, and shows testis-specific expression. The encoded protein could be a spermatogenesis-specific component of the DNA-binding general transcription factor complex TFIID. Alternatively spliced transcript variants encoding different isoforms have been found for this gene. [provided by RefSeq, Dec 2009].

References

Further reading